The 1928–29 season was the thirty-fourth season in which Dundee competed at a Scottish national level, playing in Division One under new manager Jimmy Bissett, where they would finish in 18th place, surviving relegation by 3 points. Dundee would also compete in the Scottish Cup, where they would make it to the 3rd round for the third consecutive season before being knocked out by rivals Dundee United, a reverse from the previous season. The club would change jersey design, favouring a collar over buttons and white borders to the arms, whilst continuing to occasionally wear black shorts as a change kit.

Scottish Division One 

Statistics provided by Dee Archive.

League table

Scottish Cup 

Statistics provided by Dee Archive.

Player Statistics 
Statistics provided by Dee Archive

|}

See also 

 List of Dundee F.C. seasons

References

External links 

 1928-29 Dundee season on Fitbastats

Dundee F.C. seasons
Dundee